Julia Bleck (born 6 March 1985) is a German sailor. She competed in the Yngling event at the 2008 Summer Olympics.

References

External links
 
 

1985 births
Living people
German female sailors (sport)
Olympic sailors of Germany
Sailors at the 2008 Summer Olympics – Yngling
Sportspeople from Berlin